is a Japanese footballer currently playing as a forward for Tegevajaro Miyazaki from 2023, on loan from Zweigen Kanazawa as a designated special player.

Career statistics

Club
.

Notes

References

External links

2002 births
Living people
Japanese footballers
Association football forwards
J2 League players
J3 League players
Zweigen Kanazawa players
Ococias Kyoto AC players
Tegevajaro Miyazaki players